The 1996 Monmouth Hawks football team represented Monmouth University in the 1996 NCAA Division I-AA football season as a first-year member of the Northeast Conference (NEC). It was Monmouth's first year as a member of a conference after their transition from being an NCAA Division I-AA independent program. The Hawks were led by fourth-year head coach Kevin Callahan and played their home games at Kessler Field. They finished the season 5–4 overall and 3–1 in NEC play to share the conference championship with Robert Morris. They were not invited to participate in the Division I-AA postseason.

Schedule

References

Monmouth
Monmouth Hawks football seasons
Northeast Conference football champion seasons
Monmouth Hawks football